Flow is a Foetus album released in 2001. It is also seen as a return to form for Foetus. The album was remixed as Blow.

Track listing 

The opening of track Quick Fix uses a sample of the song "Corrosion" by Ministry (band), from their album Psalm 69 (album).
Sections of Flow are used in the soundtrack of The Venture Bros.  Notably, the song "Mandelay" is the theme music of its namesake character, Mandelay.
"(You Got Me Confused With) Someone Who Cares" makes significant use of a guitar riff sampled from Electric Light Orchestra's track "Laredo Tornado", from their Eldorado album.

Personnel 
Musicians
Oren Bloedow – guitar on "Victim or Victor?"
Christian Gibbs – guitar on "Victim or Victor?"
J. G. Thirlwell (as Foetus) – vocals, instruments, arrangements, production, recording, illustrations
Hahn Rowe – violin on "Mandelay"
Production and additional personnel
Drew Anderson – mastering
Rob Sutton – engineering
Steve Schwartz – art direction

References

External links
 
 Flow at foetus.org

2001 albums
Foetus (band) albums
Albums produced by JG Thirlwell
Thirsty Ear Recordings albums